Due to the political status of Taiwan, the Republic of China (ROC) competed as Chinese Taipei at the 1992 Winter Olympics in Albertville, France.  The International Olympic Committee mandates that the Chinese Taipei Olympic Committee flag is used, and not the flag of the Republic of China.

Competitors
The following is the list of number of competitors in the Games.

Alpine skiing

Men

Bobsleigh

Figure skating

Men

References

Official Olympic Reports
 Olympic Winter Games 1992, full results by sports-reference.com

Nations at the 1992 Winter Olympics
1992
1992 in Taiwanese sport